Hippo Campus is an American indie rock band from Saint Paul, Minnesota. They are signed to Grand Jury Records in the United States and Transgressive Records in the United Kingdom. The band has performed at South by Southwest, Lollapalooza, Bonnaroo, Summerfest and Reading and Leeds Festivals, as well as on Conan. Hippo Campus were named one of NPR Music's favorite new artists of 2017.

History

Formation (2013)
Hippo Campus was formed when Jake Luppen (lead vocals/guitar), Nathan Stocker (lead guitar/vocals), Zach Sutton (bass/keyboard), and Whistler Isaiah Allen (drums/vocals) met at the Saint Paul Conservatory for Performing Artists where they studied jazz, and Luppen trained in opera. SPCPA friend DeCarlo Jackson (trumpet) began playing regularly with them in 2017. Many of them played in other bands (Blatant Youth/Whistle Kid; Danger, Will Robinson/Northern) before uniting as Hippo Campus, a name Nathan Stocker chose while in psychology class. They often performed under their stage names The Turntan, Stitches, Espo, and Beans respectively, but no longer use the names on stage.

Tarzan Rejects EP (2013)

Hippo Campus recorded and released an EP entitled Tarzan Rejects in 2013. This EP consisted of five tracks, two of which are original recordings of the songs "Little Grace" and "South".

Bashful Creatures and South EPs (2014–2016)
On November 18, 2014, Hippo Campus independently released their EP titled, Bashful Creatures, produced by Low's Alan Sparhawk. They later signed with Grand Jury records, and re-released Bashful Creatures with their new label on May 5, 2015. The band supported the release with an appearance at SXSW, and a performance on Conan.  The EP featured two singles,  "Little Grace" and "Suicide Saturday", and Hippo Campus did live sessions at KCRW's Morning Becomes Eclectic, and KEXP. On December 26, 2015, they appeared on the nationally broadcast CBS This Morning. Paste named them Best of What's Next in 2015.

On August 30, 2015, the band's song "The Halocline" was featured in the series finale of the TNT series Falling Skies and later they toured with Modest Mouse, Walk the Moon, The Mowgli's, Rubblebucket, Vacationer, My Morning Jacket, and they made an appearance at Lollapalooza in Chicago, Summerfest in Milwaukee,  Rock the Garden in Minneapolis, and Reading and Leeds Festivals in the United Kingdom.

Hippo Campus released their second EP, South in October 2015. South went to #16 on the Billboard Heatseekers chart.

Landmark and warm glow EP (2016–2018)
The band released the single "Boyish" prior to their first full-length album, the guitar-based Landmark, which came out February 24, 2017. The #3 Billboard Heatseeker album was produced by BJ Burton, who produced albums for Low and Bon Iver.

Landmark was described by the Minneapolis Star Tribune as "loaded with thickly cushioned ambiance, billowy melodies and concisely written songs." Their second single from the album was "Way It Goes" which they performed on their second appearance on the Conan show.

They played a sold-out show at the iconic venue First Avenue in March 2017, and then Hippo Campus embarked on an international headline tour. That summer they played Bonnaroo Festival in Manchester, Tennessee and Lollapalooza in Chicago.

Hippo Campus next released a self-produced three-song EP called warm glow on September 12, 2017.

In spring and summer 2018, Hippo Campus performed at Sasquatch! Music Festival in George, Washington, and again at Reading and Leeds Festivals in the UK, and opened for Sylvan Esso at Red Rocks in Morrison, Colorado.

Bambi and Demos (2018-2020) 
The band's sophomore album Bambi, released September 28, 2018, was preceded by the singles "Passenger", "Golden", and "Bambi". Once again produced by BJ Burton, the Boston Globe noted that it was "a massive step forward" as the band used more synthesizer and programmed drums.

Hippo Campus headlined their own tour from Fall 2018 into Winter 2019 across the United States, the United Kingdom and Europe. They did a live session at WFUV radio, among other similar appearances.

In Fall 2018, they performed at venues like Chicago’s Riviera Theater and New York City’s Terminal 5 and UK indie hotspot SWX Nightclub in Bristol on their Bambi Tour.

In March 2019, Hippo Campus performed in two countries in Asia. During the summer of 2019, Hippo Campus joined their tour with The Head and the Heart, opening at venues such as Red Rocks for two sold out shows.

During June and July 2019, the band released two demo albums. Demos I was released on June 14, 2019 and consisted of early/alternate versions of songs that had been previously released on Bambi. Demos II was released on July 10, 2019 and consisted of songs that were worked on during the same time as Bambi, but not included on the album.

The band's frontman, Jake Luppen, released his debut solo album as "Lupin" in October 2020.

Good Dog, Bad Dream and LP3 (2021–present) 
On August 6, 2021, the band released the EP Good Dog, Bad Dream.

Hippo Campus released the single "Boys" on October 18, 2021, as well as announcing a new album, LP3, which was released on February 4, 2022.

On February 16, 2023, Hippo Campus announced the release of a new single titled "Kick In The Teeth", which was released on February 21.

Philanthropy 
As part of the Me Too movement, Hippo Campus teamed up with the Women's Foundation of Minnesota to help donate profits from their merchandise sales to that foundation. They partnered with Normal Parents and Everytown For Gun Safety selling special "Thoughts and Prayers" T-shirts to raise awareness.

Headlining tours 
Spring Tour (2016)
June Tour (2016)
Landmark Tour (2017)
Winter Tour (2018)
Bambi Tour (2018 - 2019)
LP3 Tour (2022)

Discography
Studio albums
Landmark (2017)
Bambi (2018)
LP3 (2022)

Demo albums
Demos I (2019)
Demos II (2019)

EPs
Tarzan Rejects (2013)
Bashful Creatures (2014)
South (2015)
warm glow (2017)
Good Dog, Bad Dream (2021)
Wasteland  (2023)

Singles
"Little Grace" (2015)
"South" (2015)
"Violet" (2015)
"Boyish" (2016)
"Monsoon" (2016)
"Last Snowstorm of the Year" (2016)
"Baseball" (2017)
"Way It Goes" (2017)
"Passenger" (2018)
"Bambi" (2018)
"Golden" (2018)
"Why Even Try" (2018)
"Bad Dream Baby" (2021)
"Boys" (2021)
"Semi Pro" (2021)
"Ride or Die" (2022)
"Bang Bang" (2022)
"Kick in the Teeth" (2023)

References

External links
 
 Facebook
 Twitter
 Instagram

Indie rock musical groups from Minnesota
Musical groups established in 2013
Musical quintets
2013 establishments in Minnesota